Institute of Business Management, commonly known as IBMNCE, is a public business school of the Jadavpur University located in Kolkata, India. It was established in 1984 by the National Council of Education (NCE), Bengal (which also founded the Jadavpur University). Recently, this esteemed institution introduced its very own alumni association JUMBAESA with a group of its former students, located out of their campus.

History
AICTE approved, Jadavpur University affiliated Institute of Business Management is a product of century old National Council of Education, Bengal, born out of the freedom movement, and established on 11 March 1905. Besides founding Jadavpur University in 1955 under an act passed in the State Assembly, National Council of Education, Bengal established an educational complex consisting of Jadavpur Vidyapith (1957), covering Nursery through Higher Secondary, Jadavpur Vidyapth College of Education (1969), offering B.Ed. degree, and the Institute of Business Management(1984) offering management programs.

Academics
The management programs offered are :
 
 Master of Business Administration (MBA) (3-years Evening Course)

The institute considers CAT/MAT scores followed by GD-PI or JEMAT scores (through counselling) for admission to the above courses. The programs are for working executives as well as for freshers, through case based interactive learning sessions by faculty members drawn from industries, institutes and universities. Students here specialize in Marketing, Systems, Human Resources, Finance or Project Management. All the courses are approved by All India Council of Technical Education.

See also
International School of Business, Kolkata

References

External links
 Official IBMNCE website

Business schools in Kolkata
Educational institutions established in 1984
1984 establishments in West Bengal